The 2015 Men's Hockey Hamburg Masters was the twentieth edition of the Hamburg Masters, an international men's field hockey tournament, consisting of a series of test matches. It was held in Hamburg, Germany, from July 30 to August 2, 2015, and featured four of the top nations in men's field hockey.

Competition format
The tournament featured the national teams of Belgium, England, Spain, and the hosts, Germany, competing in a round-robin format, with each team playing each other once. Three points were awarded for a win, one for a draw, and none for a loss.

Results

Matches

Statistics

Goalscorers

References

2015
Men
2015 in German sport
2015 in Belgian sport
2015 in English sport
2015 in Spanish sport
Sport in Hamburg
July 2015 sports events in Germany
August 2015 sports events in Germany